Kozhikode railway station also known as Calicut railway station is one of the largest railway stations in the state of Kerala, India. At  in financial year 2018–19, it is the largest in terms of passenger revenue in Palakkad division. The station has four platforms, two terminals and a total number of six tracks. The first platform has a capacity to accommodate trains with 24 coaches and second & third platform has the capacity to accommodate 20 coaches; and the fourth one has the capacity to accommodate 24 coaches. It heralds as the only A1-graded station in Palghat railway division with a daily turnout exceeding 25,000 passengers. It is one of the major railway stations in Kerala with trains connecting the city to other major cities in India such as Thiruvananthapuram, Chennai, Bengaluru, New Delhi, Mumbai, Pune, Hyderabad, Coimbatore, Visakhapatnam, Kolkata, Mangaluru, Jammu Tawi, Goa, Ernakulam and so forth.

An integrated security system was installed at the station in 2012 featuring baggage scanners, CCTVs and vehicle scanners. The 125th anniversary of the station was celebrated on 2 January 2013.

History

The railway line to Calicut (now Kozhikode) was opened to traffic on 2 January 1888 and at that time was western terminus of the Madras Railway. The first line in Malabar was laid between Chaliyam and Tirur, the former an important port town, back then. With the arrival of the new line to Calicut and its growth as an administrative centre, Chaliyam diminished in significance and the railway line to it was subsequently abandoned.

The station houses several vintage fixtures including a recreation club named the Railway Institute built by the British adjacent to the station in 1888 to serve as a venue for the social life of the Railways' employees, and a cast iron mechanical pump set that was imported from England to pump water into steam locomotives.
The 125th anniversary of the station was celebrated on 2 January 2013. It has been ranked as "The Cleanest Railway Station of India" in January 2018 .

Infrastructure
The station has four platforms and two terminals. The first platform has a capacity to accommodate trains with 24 coaches and the third platform 20 coaches. The fourth one has the capacity to accommodate 24 coaches. It heralds as the only A–1 graded station in Palakkad railway division with a daily turnout exceeding 25,000 passengers.

Services
It is one of the major railway stations in Kerala with trains connecting the city to other major cities in India such as Thiruvananthapuram, Chennai, Bangalore, New Delhi, Mumbai, Pune, Hyderabad, Coimbatore, Visakhapatnam, Mangalore, Jammu Tawi, Goa, Ernakulam and so forth. Other railway stations in the city include  (code: FK), Kallayi Kozhikode South (code: KUL), Vellayil railway station (code: VLL) and West Hill railway station (code: WH).

Facilities 
An integrated security system was installed at the station in 2012 featuring baggage scanners, CCTVs and vehicle scanners.

Reservation counters are open between 6:00 am to 8:00 pm
Retirement Rooms (transit lodging facility)
Cyber cafe
Parcel booking Office
Railway Mailing service (RMS) office
Railway Protection Force – Circle office
IRCTC Restaurants
ATMs
Pre-Paid autorickshaw counters
Pre-paid parking space
Escalator and elevator systems
Battery operated car facility for differently abled persons and senior citizens

ATMs
The following bank-ATMs are available at the railway station:

 Indian Bank
 Indian Overseas Bank
 Canara Bank
 State Bank of India
 Punjab National Bank

See also
 List of railway stations in Kerala
 Koyilandy railway station

References

External links

Railway stations in Kozhikode district
Palakkad railway division
Transport in Kozhikode
Railway stations in India opened in 1888
Buildings and structures in Kozhikode